Heart of America Sports Attractions, also known as the Midwest Wrestling Association, Central States Wrestling and the World Wrestling Alliance, was an American professional wrestling promotion that ran shows mainly in Kansas, Missouri, Nebraska and Iowa. Due to the promotion's main office and base of operations being in Kansas City, Missouri the territory was often referred to simply as "Kansas City". The promotion existed from July 1948 until it closed in 1988. The territory was one of the original territories of the National Wrestling Alliance with two of the six "founding fathers" of the NWA (Paul "Pinkie" George and Orville Brown) promoting in it.

History

Midwest Wrestling Association
Originally known as the "Midwest Wrestling Association" before the formation of the National Wrestling Alliance it controlled and booked shows territories in Kansas, Missouri, Nebraska and Iowa and was seen as a cornerstone of the NWA. It joined the NWA in October 1948. The territory was promoted by Pinkie George and the first official NWA World Heavyweight Champion Orville Brown (Sonny Myers being the preceding unofficial one) from the creation of the NWA until 1958.

The MWA World Heavyweight Championship began in 1940, preceding the consolidation with the CSW and WWA.

Heart of America Sports Attractions forms
In 1963, wrestler/promoter Bob Geigel took over and partnered up with Pat O'Conner and promoters George Simpson and Gust Karras to form "Heart of America Sports Attractions, Inc." The promotion continued to be a cornerstone of the NWA with Geigel sitting on the board of directors and even served as chairman of the National Wrestling Alliance from 1978 until 1987, the period that is considered the last "glory years" of the NWA. Central States Wrestling did not become a household name across the United States until 1973, when Harley Race brought attention to CSW (and its "sister promotion" the St. Louis Wrestling Club) by winning the NWA World Heavyweight Title for the first time.

Under Jim Crockett Promotions
In 1986, Geigel sold the promotion to Jim Crockett Promotions owner Jim Crockett, Jr., who ran the territory from September 1986 until February 1987, where Bob Geigel bought the promotion back and co partnered with George Petraski.

World Wrestling Alliance
After stepping down as chairman of the NWA, Geigel withdrew his promotion from the NWA in late 1987 and formed a new sanctioning body known as the "World Wrestling Alliance" in an attempt to compete with the national expansion of Jim Crockett and Vince McMahon. The move did not pay off and Geigel closed the WWA in 1989.

Central-States Championship Wrestling
The NWA Central States Heavyweight Championship is currently controlled by the NWA affiliate Central-States Championship Wrestling (CCW).

Tape library
The promotion's classic tape library is currently owned by WWE, who obtained through their purchase of World Championship Wrestling, the previous owners of the library.

Former personnel

Championships

See also
List of National Wrestling Alliance territories
List of independent wrestling promotions in the United States

References

External links
CentralStates.net
Central States title histories at Wrestling-Titles.com

Independent professional wrestling promotions based in the Midwestern United States
Sports in the Kansas City metropolitan area
1948 establishments in Missouri
1988 disestablishments in Missouri
Jim Crockett Promotions
National Wrestling Alliance members